The Albert J. Beveridge Award is awarded  by the American Historical Association (AHA) for the best English-language book on American history (United States, Canada, or Latin America) from 1492 to the present. It was established on a biennial basis in 1939 in memory of United States Senator Albert J. Beveridge (1862-1927) of Indiana, former secretary and longtime member of the  Association, through a gift from his wife, Catherine Eddy Beveridge and donations from AHA members from his home state. The award has been given annually since 1945.

Recipients
Source: AHA

1939 – John T. Horton for  James Kent: A Study in Conservatism 
1941 – Charles A. Barker for  The Background of the Revolution in Maryland 
1943 – Harold Whitman Bradley for  American Frontier in Hawaii: The Pioneers, 1780-1843 
1945 – John Richard Alden for  John Stuart and the Southern Colonial Frontier 
1946 – Arthur Eugene Bestor, Jr. for  Backwoods Utopias: The Sectarian and Owenite Phases of Communitarian Socialism in America: 1663-1829 
1947 – Lewis Hanke for  The Spanish Struggle for Justice in the Conquest of America 
1948 – Donald Fleming for  John William Draper and the Religion of Science 
1949 – Reynold M. Wik for  Steam Power on the American Farm: A Chapter in Agricultural History, 1850–1920 
1950 – Glyndon G. Van Deusen for  Horace Greeley: Nineteenth Century Crusader 
1951 – Robert Twyman for  History of Marshall Field and Co., 1852–1906 
1952 – Clarence Versteeg for  Robert Morris 
1953 – George R. Bentley for  A History of the Freedman's Bureau 
1954 – Arthur M. Johnson for  The Development of American Petroleum Pipelines: A Study in Enterprise and Public Policy 
1955 – Ian C.C. Graham for  Colonists from Scotland: Emigration to North America, 1707–1783 
1956 – Paul W. Schroeder for  The Axis Alliance and Japanese-American Relations, 1941 
1957 – David M. Pletcher for  Rails, Mines and Progress: Seven American Promoters in Mexico, 1867-1911 
1958 – Paul Conkin for  Tomorrow a New World: The New Deal Community Program 
1959 – Arnold M. Paul for  Free Conservative Crisis and the Rule of Law: Attitudes of Bar and Bench, 1887–1895 
1960 – Clarence C. Clendenen for  The United States and Pancho Villa;: A study in unconventional diplomacy, 
1960 – Nathan Miller for  The Enterprise of a Free People: Canals and the Canal Fund in the New York Economy, 1792–1838 
1961 – Calvin Dearmond Davis for  The United States And The First Hague Peace Conference 
1962 – Walter LaFeber for  The New Empire: An Interpretation of American Expansion, 1860-1898  
1963 – no award given
1964 – Linda Grant DePauw for  The Eleventh Pillar: New York State and the Federal Constitution 
1965 – Daniel M. Fox for  The Discovery of Abundance 
1966 – Herman Belz for  Reconstructing the Union: Conflict of Theory and Policy during the Civil War 
1968 – Michael Paul Rogin for  Intellectuals and McCarthy: The Radical Specter 
1969 – Sam Bass Warner, Jr. for  The Private City: Philadelphia in Three Periods of Its Growth 
1970 – Leonard L. Richards for  "Gentlemen of Property and Standing": Anti-Abolition Mobs in Jacksonian America  
1970 – Sheldon Hackney for  Populism to Progressivism in Alabama 
1971 – Carl N. Degler for  Neither Black Nor White: Slavery and Race Relations in Brazil and the United States 
1971 – David J. Rothman for  The Discovery of the Asylum: Social Order and Disorder in the New Republic 
1972 – James T. Lemon for  The Best Poor Man's Country: Early Southeastern Pennsylvania 
1973 – Richard Slotkin for  Regeneration Through Violence: The Mythology of the American Frontier, 1600-1860 
1974 – Peter H. Wood for  Black Majority: Negroes in Colonial South Carolina from 1670 Through the Stono Rebellion  
1975 – David Brion Davis for  The Problem of Slavery in the Age of Revolution, 1770-1823 
1976 – Edmund S. Morgan for  American Slavery American Freedom: The Ordeal of Colonial Virginia 
1977 – Henry F. May for  The Enlightenment in America  
1978 – John Leddy Phelan for  The People and the King: The Comunero Revolution in Colombia, 1781 
1979 – Calvin Martin for  Keepers of the Game: Indian-Animal Relationships and the Fur Trade  
1980 – John W. Reps for  Cities of the American West: A History of Frontier Urban Planning 
1981 – Paul G. E. Clemens for  The Atlantic Economy and Colonial Maryland's Eastern Shore 
1982 – Walter Rodney for  A History of the Guyanese Working People, 1881-1905  
1983 – Louis R. Harlan for  Booker T. Washington: Volume 2: The Wizard Of Tuskegee, 1901-1915  
1984 – Sean Wilentz for  Chants Democratic: New York City and the Rise of the American Working Class, 1788-1850 
1985 – Nancy M. Farriss for  Maya society under colonial rule: The collective enterprise of survival 
1986 – Alan S. Knight for  The Mexican Revolution 
1987 – Mary C. Karasch for  Slave Life in Rio De Janeiro, 1808-1850 
1988 – Jacquelyn Dowd Hall, James Leloudis, Robert Korstad, Mary Murphy, Christopher B. Daly, Lu Ann Jones for  Like a Family: The Making of a Southern Cotton Mill World  
1989 – Peter Novick for  That Noble Dream: The 'Objectivity Question' and the American Historical Profession  
1990 – Jon Butler for  Awash in a Sea of Faith: Christianizing the American People  
1991 – Richard Price for  Alabi's World  
1992 – Richard White for  The Middle Ground: Indians, Empires, and Republics in the Great Lakes Region, 1650-1815  
1993 – James Lockhart for  The Nahuas After the Conquest: A Social and Cultural History of the Indians of Central Mexico, Sixteenth Through Eighteenth Centuries 
1994 – Karen Ordahl Kupperman for  Providence Island, 1630-1641: The Other Puritan Colony 
1995 – Ann Douglas for  Terrible Honesty: Mongrel Manhattan in the 1920s 
1995 – Stephen Innes for  Creating the Commonwealth: The Economic Culture of Puritan New England 
1996 – Alan Taylor for  William Cooper's Town: Power and Persuasion on the Frontier of the Early American Republic 
1997 – William B. Taylor for  Magistrates of the Sacred: Priests and Parishioners in Eighteenth-Century Mexico 
1998 – Philip D. Morgan for  Slave Counterpoint: Black Culture in the Eighteenth-Century Chesapeake and Lowcountry  
1999 – Friedrich Katz for  The Life and Times of Pancho Villa 
2000 – Linda Gordon for  The Great Arizona Orphan Abduction 
2001 – Alexander Keyssar for  The Right to Vote: The Contested History of Democracy in the United States 
2002 – Mary A. Renda for  Taking Haiti: Military Occupation and the Culture of U.S. Imperialism, 1915-1940 
2003 – Ira Berlin for  Generations of Captivity: A History of African-American Slaves 
2004 – Edward L. Ayers for  In the Presence of Mine Enemies: The Civil War in the Heart of America, 1859-1863 
2005 – Melvin Patrick Ely for  Israel on the Appomattox: A Southern Experiment in Black Freedom from the 1790s Through the Civil War 
2006 – Louis S. Warren for  Buffalo Bill's America: William Cody and the Wild West Show 
2007 – Allan M. Brandt for  The Cigarette Century: The Rise, Fall, and Deadly Persistence of the Product That Defined America 
2008 – Scott Kurashige for  The Shifting Grounds of Race: Black and Japanese Americans in the Making of Multiethnic Los Angeles 
2009 – Karl Jacoby for  Shadows at Dawn: A Borderlands Massacre and the Violence of History 
2010 – John Robert McNeill for  Mosquito Empires: Ecology and War in the Greater Caribbean, 1620–1914 
2011 - Daniel Okrent for Last Call: The Rise and Fall of Prohibition 
2012 - Rebecca J. Scott and Jean M. Hebrard for Freedom Papers: An Atlantic Odyssey in the Age of Emancipation
2013 - W. Jeffrey Bolster for The Mortal Sea: Fishing the Atlantic in the Age of Sail
2014 - Kate Brown  for Plutopia: Nuclear Families, Atomic Cities, and the Great Soviet and American Plutonium Disasters
2015 - Elizabeth Fenn for Encounters at the Heart of the World: A History of the Mandan People 
2015 - Greg Grandin for The Empire of Necessity: Slavery, Freedom, and Deception in the New World
2016 - Ann Twinam for Purchasing Whiteness: Pardos, Mulattos, and the Quest for Social Mobility in the Spanish Indies
2017 - David Chang, The World and All the Things upon It: Native Hawaiian Geographies of Exploration
2018 - Camilla Townsend - Annals of Native America: How the Nahuas of Colonial Mexico Kept Their History
2019 - Nan C. Enstad - Cigarettes, Inc.: An Intimate History of Corporate Imperialism
2020 - Jeremy Zallen - American Lucifers: The Dark History of Artificial Light, 1750–1865
2021 - Thavolia Glymph - The Women’s Fight: The Civil War’s Battles for Home, Freedom, and Nation
2022 - Roberto Saba - American Mirror: The United States and Brazil in the Age of Emancipation

See also

 List of history awards

References

External links
 Albert J. Beveridge Award at the American Historical Association
 Albert J. Beveridge Award at lovethebook

History awards
Awards established in 1928
American non-fiction literary awards
1928 establishments in the United States